Amy Greenbank is an Australian journalist.

She is currently a political reporter and presenter on ABC News.

She has previously hosted a breakfast news program and worked as a reporter in Sydney for Sky News Australia , and a weather reporter for Sky News Weather and for its predecessor, The Weather Channel.

Career

Greenbank grew up in Grafton, New South Wales and attended South Grafton Primary School from 1992. She is a graduate of the University of Queensland and completed a Master of Arts in journalism in 2013 at Charles Sturt University.

On 18 November 2016, Greenbank suffered a cut to her face after being pushed by a woman she was filming as part of a media contingent covering a court case. She required medical attention after the incident.

In July 2018, Greenbank joined ABC News as a reporter and presenter.

References

Living people
Australian television journalists
Sky News Australia reporters and presenters
Journalists from Sydney
Year of birth missing (living people)
University of Queensland alumni